Closed Door (Spanish:Puerta cerrada) is a 1939  Argentine drama film directed by John Alton and Luis Saslavsky. The film stars Libertad Lamarque, Angelina Pagano and Agustín Irusta.

References

External links

1939 films
1930s Spanish-language films
Argentine black-and-white films
1930s musical drama films
Tango films
Films directed by Luis Saslavsky
1930s dance films
Argentine musical drama films
1939 drama films
1930s Argentine films